London Irish RFC is a professional rugby union club which competes in the Premiership, the top division of English rugby union. The club has also competed in the Anglo-Welsh Cup, the European Champions Cup and European Challenge Cup. While playing in the Championship in 2016–17 and 2018–19, it also played in the British and Irish Cup and RFU Championship Cup. The club played home games at the Madejski Stadium in Reading, Berkshire, for twenty years, before moving for the 2020–21 season to the Gtech Community Stadium in Brentford, West London.

The club was founded in 1898 following the creation of London Scottish and London Welsh for the same reason, allowing Irishmen the chance to play rugby with fellow countrymen in the English Capital.  

London Irish won its first major trophy in 2002, the Powergen Cup (now the Premiership Rugby Cup), and reached the 2009 English Premiership final, narrowly losing 10–9 to Leicester Tigers at Twickenham Stadium. In the 2007–08 season, the team came close to a place in the Heineken Cup Final, losing out to Stade Toulousain 15–21 in the semi-final at Twickenham Stadium.

History

Formation and Early Years

London Irish was the last club to be formed in England by working and student exiles from the home countries, following London Scottish in 1878 and London Welsh in 1885. The first game took place on 1 October 1898 against the former Hammersmith club at Herne Hill Athletic Ground, with London Irish winning 8–3. The team that season benefited from the early recruitment of vet and Irish international Louis Magee. He became essential in the early years of the club along with club captain R.S Dyas in putting the team on the map and having regular fixtures between other London based teams.

War and Conflict
The turn of the new century was a great time for London Irish with the club firmly solidified in the London Club Roster but this would be some of the last years of normality for the team. With the commencement of World War I, many of the players enlisted with Irish Battalions in their homeland for deployment in mainland Europe. In 1916, remaining players and members returned to Ireland to fight in the Easter Rising and many who joined regiments did not return. It is unknown how many were lost with a connection to the club. Following the formation of the Irish Free State in 1923, those who fought in both battles returned to the club which saw a overhaul of the club over the remainder of the decade, reviving the team and its influence for a new beginning.

In the years that followed, Irish made strides to playing competition outside of Greater London with matches against teams such as Leicester and Cardiff. This however was short lived with the commencement of World War II with players and members again being displaced across the continent, many of which elected not to return following the end of the war. 9 of the players who played in the 1938–39 season died in the conflict. The Club's then playing ground located in Sunbury-on-Thames was acquired by Ministry for Agriculture to be used as a site to grow food for the war-torn capital. Because of the state of the playing field after the war, games were temporarily held at Rectory Field in Blackheath.

Post-war Years
The years that followed got off to a rocky beginning. Player numbers weren't what they used to be as former members elected not to move back to London and this made it difficult to front a starting XV. The year that followed brought in the Winter of 1946, one of the coldest winters on record in the United Kingdom. Rectory Field was frozen for most the winter meaning Irish missed matches in the season. Things picked up with the arrival of new captain, Des O'Brien and a number of other key players, and in 1948, London Irish celebrated their 50th anniversary and the most successful season yet for the club.

In the 1950s, the club thrived fielding teams most weeks and in 1951 they became the first club to host touring Italian team Roma. On September 9th, 1959, Irish officially returned to Sunbury and had a place to call home, dubbed The Avenue. They performed a record-breaking season where they didn't lose a single game.

The success of the 1960s for the London Irish was mixed, with many good wins but also a number of defeats. Fixtures improved and the club played against many famous teams which changed the attitude of the training and playing, and in the seventies, London Irish became a force to be reckoned with, finishing first in the London Division of the Rugby Football Union in the 1976/77 season. Pre-season tours became popular and in 1977, the London Irish made history in South Africa when they became the first touring side to play a host of mixed race teams.

Professional Era

Since the professional era began in August 1995, London Irish has only lifted one piece of major silverware, winning the Powergen Cup in 2002 in a match against Northampton at Twickenham that saw the club win 38-7. 75,000 people attended the match seeing the exiles win in what is regarded as one of the most successful days in the club's history. London Irish enjoyed success in Europe in 2005-06 when they reached the final of the Challenge Cup, only to be defeated by Gloucester 36-34 in what was an extremely close game at Twickenham. In 2013, Irish was taken over by a consortium led by Mick Crossan, executive chairman of Powerday, a London based Recycling and Waste Management firm. Powerday would go on to be one of the club's main sponsors.

Academy
London Irish manages its own academy, with players such as Tom Homer, Nick Kennedy, Topsy Ojo, Anthony Watson, Brothers Delon Armitage & Guy Armitage, Alex Corbisiero and Jonathan Joseph having gone on to play for the senior side and be internationally capped. Ojo retired at the end of the 2018–19 season having made 301 appearances for the club despite clearly having no Irish heritage nor ancestry.

Stadium

Since the 2020–21 season, London Irish play at the Gtech Community Stadium, in Brentford, Greater London. The stadium is owned by Brentford F.C. who also play their home games there. The ground is a 17,250 all-seater capacity stadium which opened in 2020. All London Irish home matches are generally played at Brentford.

Prior to 2020, the club played at the Madejski Stadium in Reading, Berkshire for 20 seasons between 2000 and March 2020 when the 2019–20 season was suspended due to the COVID-19 pandemic. Due to delays owing to the aforementioned pandemic, Brentford Stadium was running behind its scheduled opening date. Irish made the decision to play its remaining games when possible at Harlequin's Twickenham Stoop as they could not return to Reading. The Exiles had previously played at The Stoop in the 1999–2000 Season before moving to the Madejski Stadium.

 
 
The largest crowd for a London Irish match was for a game against London Wasps on 15 March 2008 during the 2007–08 season. The crowd of 23,790 was also the highest attendance for a regular season Premiership Rugby match until December 2008.

On 12 March 2016 London Irish played their first home Premiership match abroad, and also the first-ever Premiership match outside England, when they travelled to the United States to face Saracens at the New York Red Bulls' Red Bull Arena in the New York metropolitan area.

On 15 August 2016, the club announced its intention to return to London and that it was in formal discussions with Hounslow London Borough Council to play at Brentford's new stadium. On 10 February 2017, the club confirmed that the council had approved its application to use the stadium for rugby, effectively allowing them to move into the new stadium from its opening season. This was later confirmed.

The club's current training ground and offices are located at the Hazelwood Centre, which is located in the west of the city in Sunbury-on-Thames. The facility was opened in 2014 following the closure of The Avenue and is also used by NFL teams during the NFL International Series as a training facility.

London Irish Amateur Rugby Football Club

The club also hosts London Irish Amateur RFC (a separate legal entity) for non-professionals to allow them to improve in Rugby. The team plays at the location of London Irish's training ground and offices, Hazelwood in Sunbury. Some players such as Justin Bishop and Kieran Campbell have gone through the ranks to play for London Irish professional team.

Mascot

Digger
Digger is an Irish Wolfhound and official mascot of London Irish. He has an important job in providing support to the club.

On 30 May 2003 Digger won the "Best Mascot" award in Premiership Rugby at the Premier Rugby Marketing Awards.

On 23 April 2006, Digger ran the London Marathon raising money for Spinal Research. He finished the marathon in a time of 6 hours 39 minutes 31 seconds.

Others

Digger was joined by his cousin, Duggie, from the 2006–07 season. Much taller and much slower, Duggie has proved popular with younger children attending matchdays. As well as the mascot characters, there is also a real Irish Wolfhound, Mr Doyle, who also attends the home games. Before Mr Doyle, his Great Uncle, Jumbo, attended home games before Jumbo retired and eventually died.

Rivalries
London Irish have rivalries in the Greater London area, mainly with Harlequins and Saracens who are now, thanks to Irish moving back to West London, able to have local derbies. Gtech Community Stadium's location makes it less than 2 miles to the Twickenham Stoop. They also maintain a friendly rivalry with London Scottish of who they were teamed with as another exile team.

Current kit
The kit is currently supplied by BLK. The green home kit is made from Exotek fabric and features gel grippers on the front and gripper tape at the seams. The jersey also features a sectioned crew neck, club colour detailing on the sleeve and a silicone gel finish on the club crest.

The club's principal sponsor Powerday, appears on the front centre on a broad red lined white stripe. Above this, the club's crest appears on the left chest and 9 Group on the right chest. Other club sponsors Pump Technology and Keltbray appear on the back. The playing shorts are plain featuring only the logo of the club and manufacturer.

The away kit is white and features a similar design with Powerday appearing on a broad green stripe.

London Irish recently announced a new elite partnership with Just Clear, an environmentally friendly British house clearance and rubbish removal service in readiness for new Premiership season. London Irish CEO, Mark Bensted, welcomed the arrival of a new partnership to the Club’s commercial portfolio, commenting: “I’m delighted Just Clear are joining the London Irish family". Such news potentially points to London Irish's consolidation of their Premiership status as they were relegated in the 2018-19 season.

Season summaries

Gold background denotes championsSilver background denotes runners-upPink background denotes relegated

* Finished first in pool but did not progress to the quarter-final. Their place was taken by Brive

Club honours

Major Honours
Premiership Rugby
Runners–Up: (1) 2008–09
RFU Championship
Champions: (2) 2016–17, 2018–19
European Challenge Cup
Runners–Up: (1) 2005–06
Premiership Rugby Cup
Champions: (1) 2001–02
Runners–Up: (2) 1979–80, 2021–22
Surrey Cup
Champions: (4) 1980–81, 1981–82, 1985–86, 1986–87
Premiership Rugby Sevens Series
Champions: (1) 2012

Friendly
Middlesex Sevens
Champions: (1) 2009
Cunningham Duncombe Series
Champions: (1) 2016

Current squad

The London Irish squad for the 2022–23 season is:

Academy squad

The London Irish academy squad is:

Club staff

First-team coaching
Director of Rugby: Declan Kidney
Head coach: Les Kiss
Assistant coach Brad Davis
Assistant coach: Declan Danaher
Assistant coach: Corniel van Zyl
Assistant Forwards Coach: Ross McMillan
Assistant Forwards Coach: Jon Fisher
Team Manager: Alex James
Assistant Team Manager: Will Crowley-Johnson
Head of Strength and Conditioning: Robert Palmer
Head of analysis: James Molyneux
Senior performance analyst: Matt Carpinter
Senior performance analyst: Richard Green

Academy
Academy manager: Patrick O'Grady
Academy Backs Coach: James Lightfoot-Brown
Academy Forwards Coach: Jon Fisher
AASE Manager: Richard Pryor
Academy Performance Analyst: Brendan O'Shea

Notable former players

Rugby World Cup
The following are players which have represented their countries at the Rugby World Cup, whilst playing for London Irish:

See also
Rugby union in London
London Cornish
London Scottish
London Welsh
Richmond
Hazelwood

References

Notes

External links

 
Official Supporters Club Website
Sunbury Centre
Order of The Odd-Shaped Ball
The Craic
London Irish Amateur Rugby Football Club
London Irish on Rugby15
ERC Rugby London Irish
Premiership Rugby Official Website

 
Premiership Rugby teams
English rugby union teams
Rugby clubs established in 1898
Sport in Reading, Berkshire
Rugby union in Berkshire
Rugby union in Surrey
Rugby union clubs in London
1898 establishments in England
Irish diaspora in England
Irish diaspora sports clubs in the United Kingdom